Trachylepis wahlbergii, also known commonly as Wahlberg's striped skink, is a species of lizard in the family Scincidae. The species is native to Southern Africa.

Taxonomy
Trachylepis wahlbergii has been considered a subspecies of Trachylepis striata. Whether T. wahlbergii is truly distinct from T. striata is not fully settled.

Geographic range
T. wahlbergii occurs in southern Angola, northern Botswana, northern Namibia, western Mozambique, Zambia, and northern and western Zimbabwe.

Etymology
The specific name, wahlbergi, is in honour of Swedish Naturalist Johan August Wahlberg.

Reproduction
T. wahlbergii is viviparous.

References

Further reading
Peters W (1870). "Förteckning på de af J. Wahlberg i Damaralandet insamlade Reptilierna: Enumeratio Amphibiorum quae beat. J. Wahlberg anno 1854 ad 1855 in Africa occidentali (Damara) collegit ". Öfversigt af Kongl. Vetenskaps-Akademien Förhandlingar 26 (7): 657–662. (Euprepes wahlbergii, new species, p. 661). (in Swedish and Latin).

Trachylepis
Skinks of Africa
Reptiles of Angola
Reptiles of Botswana
Reptiles of Namibia
Reptiles of Mozambique
Reptiles of Zambia
Reptiles of Zimbabwe
Reptiles described in 1870
Taxa named by Wilhelm Peters